David Holston (born January 26, 1986) is an American professional basketball player for JDA Dijon Basket of France's LNB Pro A. He played college basketball at the Chicago State University (CSU). In 2019, he was named the Most Valuable Player of the French LNB Pro A.

Early life and college
Born in Pontiac, Michigan, Holston attended Avondale High School in Auburn Hills where he led the team to the 2002 Class B state championship. During his career at Avondale he earned all-county and all-state honors, scored over 2,000 career points, and yet was not offered a single college basketball scholarship.

Holston enrolled at Chicago State in the fall of 2004 and earned a spot on the men's basketball roster as a walk-on. During Holston's collegiate career, the school was classified as an Independent, meaning it had no athletic conference affiliation. He went on to have a prolific career at CSU but received very little national attention due to a confluence of factors: attending a small Division I school that had no conference, Chicago State's historically sub-par performance in men's basketball, and his own diminutive  stature.

During Holston's tenure at CSU between 2005–06 and 2008–09 (he redshirted his true freshman season), he scored a school-record 2,331 points, finished in the top five in points per game nationally for his senior season, led the NCAA in three-point field goals made per game in his final two seasons, and was the first Chicago State player to garner Division I postseason All-American honors, among others. Holston finished his collegiate career with averages of 19.6 points, 4.4 assists and 2.1 steals per game, and his 450 career three-pointers were the second-most in NCAA Division I history at the time of his graduation. During his senior season in 2008–09, his averages of 25.9 points, 6.4 assists, 3.7 steals and three rebounds per game led CSU to a 19–13 record—its first winning season since the school transitioned to Division I—and he was named the Independent Player of the Year.

Professional career
Due to his size, Holston was not chosen in the 2009 NBA draft. That July, he signed with Pınar Karşıyaka of the Turkish Basketball League and played for them for two seasons. During his first year, Holston averaged approximately 12 points and four assists per game, and during his second season he averaged roughly 15 points and six assists. He then signed with the Artland Dragons in Germany's Basketball Bundesliga for the 2011–12 season. In the summer of 2012, he signed a contract with Mersin BB of Tukey for the 2012–13 season. In July 2013, he returned to Artland Dragons, and stayed with them for two seasons.

In the 2018–19 season, Holston played with JDA Dijon of the French LNB Pro A. He led Dijon to the third place in the regular season. On May 20, 2019, he won the Pro A Most Valuable Player award.

See also
List of NCAA Division I men's basketball season 3-point field goal leaders
List of NCAA Division I men's basketball career 3-point scoring leaders

References

External links
Eurobasket.com profile
FIBA.com profile

1986 births
Living people
American expatriate basketball people in France
American expatriate basketball people in Germany
American expatriate basketball people in Turkey
American men's basketball players
Artland Dragons players
Basketball players from Michigan
Chicago State Cougars men's basketball players
JDA Dijon Basket players
Karşıyaka basketball players
Mersin Büyükşehir Belediyesi S.K. players
Point guards
Sportspeople from Pontiac, Michigan